Dobrynin is a Russian masculine surname, its feminine counterpart is Dobrynina. It may refer to

 Anatoly Dobrynin (1919–2010), Russian statesman
 Nikolai Dobrynin (born 1963), Russian actor
 Nikita Pustosviat (real name Nikita Konstantinovich Dobrynin, died 1683), leader of the Russian Old Believers
 Vyacheslav Dobrynin (born 1946), Russian composer and singer
 Konstantin Dobrynin (born 1976), Russian lawyer and statesman

Russian-language surnames